Lee Sung-jea (born on 29 March 1968) is a South Korean football manager and former player.

Club career 
He played for Korail FC in Korea National League.

Managerial career 
He was appointed as a South Sudan manager in 2014.

References

External links
 Lee Sung-jea Interview

1969 births
Living people
Daejeon Korail FC players
South Korean footballers
South Korean football managers
South Korean expatriate football managers
Sangji University alumni
South Sudan national football team managers
Women's national association football team managers
Expatriate football managers in Afghanistan
Expatriate football managers in South Sudan
Association footballers not categorized by position